Ivan Gavrilenko (born June 5, 1992) is a Russian professional ice hockey defenceman. He currently plays with Yuzhny Ural Orsk of the Supreme Hockey League (VHL).

Gavrilenko made his Kontinental Hockey League debut playing with Metallurg Novokuznetsk during the 2013–14 KHL season.

References

External links

1992 births
Living people
Admiral Vladivostok players
Metallurg Novokuznetsk players
Russian ice hockey defencemen
HC Sibir Novosibirsk players
People from Magnitogorsk
Sportspeople from Chelyabinsk Oblast